Water skiing was introduced as a World Games sport at the 1981 World Games in Santa Clara, California.

Medalists

Current events

Men

Slalom

Tricks

Jump

Wakeboarding

Women

Slalom

Tricks

Jump

Wakeboarding

Discontinued events

Men

Three event

Barefoot three event

Barefoot slalom

Barefoot tricks

Barefoot jump

Cable wakeboarding

Women

Three event

Barefoot three event

Barefoot slalom

Barefoot tricks

Barefoot jump

Cable wakeboarding

External links
 Sport 123 - World Games

 
Sports at the World Games
World Games